Into Glory Ride is the second studio album by American heavy metal band Manowar and the first to feature drummer Scott Columbus. The album's title is a reference to the title track from the band's previous album Battle Hymns. After 'Into Glory Ride' released, Manowar became one of the most influential bands to the development of this "epic" style of heavy metal and had a critical influence on the genre.

Background

For their second album named 'Into Glory Ride', Manowar signed another major label and gained headlines in the British music press for signing the new contract in their own blood, becoming the first band to demonstrate their commitment this way. The signing was a cover story in the 1983 July/ August issue # 47 of Kerrang!

In September 2021 interview with Ross the boss (ex-Manowar, guitarist), he explains about the image of the band and the concept that was built under the album 'Into Glory Ride': "The idea came from us, Joey and I, I'm a super history buff… I am fond of Vikings, I am fond of Ancient Greece and all of these things, and Joey as well, we were all fascinated by these things…Then swords, we ordered real swords, it was all real, we were real…we were completely involved…We used to think that everything in life is a battle, until today, everything is a battle, you have to strive to improve, to prepare, to overcome obstacles and to become a better person every day…Be good to others and tough on your enemies. We were all Manowars , or so I thought…"

Songs

Track No. 1: Warlord

The song is a Heavy Metal/ Speed Metal/ Biker Metal song of a biker (Known with Nickname as 'The warlord of the road') riding around having sex with girls. The 'Warlord' song start's with two people making love, who are quickly disturbed by the girl's parents including a broken escape by the young protagonist. The 'Warlord' is also watching television and seeing an appeal for aid in another part of the world, where the biker/ narrator says "We're livin' in a sick world… we got a lots of trouble overseas…stop sending money send em all a bomb". Manowar might be channeling the essence of the biker profile, this kind of working-class realism struck a chord with metal fans of the time, who'd embraced similar sentiments in Heavy Metal songs. The identification with biker culture is one of the primary themes in Manowar's music, the song has pressing and direct rhythm, in which the drums are immediately noticed, in relief compared to the other instruments (the hi-hat almost covers guitar and bass, which here they very balanced), 'Warlord' is a dynamic, energetic and full Heavy Metal charge: the new drummer at that album 'Scott Columbus' is a direct musician, who prefers a power and linear drumming. The high and low vocal ranges of 'Eric Adams' voice in the song are between A4, G5, F#5 & D5.

In 1996 the band's eighth album 'Louder Than Hell''' the opening track from the album called “Return of the Warlord,” is a sequel to the song “Warlord”.

Track No. 2: Secret Of Steel
The song is a Heavy Metal/ Power Metal/ Symphonic Metal/ Epic Metal. "The Riddle Of Steel" in the film 'Conan The Barbarian' is about trusting in steel and the quest for the steel sword stolen. Everything that informs Conan's attitude and actions is based around "The Riddle of Steel", the legend of his people explaining the importance of steel to their barbarian culture. The song "Secret Of Steel" has the same idea of "The Riddle Of Steel" in the film, the song take form in the song as "The Secret" to answer it (The riddle/ Secret)- The warrior must see that while steel will grow brittle and the flesh will age, it is will and conviction that prevail. It is by will and belief that the flesh is motivated to wield the sword, to use that sword rightly and not against the weak and unfortunate. It means the steel is not elevated only through brute force, detailed craftsmanship, or even strength of your hand, its power comes from the clear belief and conviction of the one who wields it.

The song 'Secret Of Steel' represents the continuation and refinement of the Epic Metal style, that Manowar first explored with the eponymous closing track to their 1982 debut album Battle Hymns, the song also known as a tribute song to the film "Conan The Barbarian". In the beginning of the movie 'Conan The Barbarian', Conan's father telling him, when he was a young boy about "The Secret Of Steel": "Fire and wind struck down the giants, and threw their bodies in the water, But in their rage, the gods forgot, the secret of steel...and left it on the battlefield, And we who found it...are just men. Not gods. Not giants. Just men. The secret of steel has always carried with it a mystery...". Manowar frequently employ steel as a central metaphor, songs themselves are compared to swords and hammers with “Steel” or “Metal” in their titles. This is their first song whose title connected with the word "Steel".

The song melody is a slow and heavy ode to Sword & Sorcery stories opens with a bottom-dominated verse from the Bassist Joey DeMaio (Bass- 4 string, 8 string). The verse sung by Adams is very solemn, with an almost doomish gait, very evocative in its description, very epic and majestic. The song remains permeated by a sense of darkness, melancholy and magic, with beautiful entrance of Guitar's riffs of Ross the Boss (Guitars), the remarkable vocal performance by Eric Adams (Vocals), who delivers a classy vocal slash, and then closes in an epic finale, where Adams' crystalline voice reaches the "high peaks" from him,  with his heroic voice cannot be compared to anything that existed in metal at the time. Moving choirs join the chorus and it is striking what effect the band creates by slowing down and increasing the tempo. The high and low vocal ranges of 'Eric Adams' voice in the song are between B2, A5, C#5, F#5 & B4.

Track No. 3: Gloves Of Metal

The song is a Heavy Metal/ Power Metal song, it is about being a warrior of metal, dressed in leather, studs and spikes, but draws on the imagery of sword and sorcery's barbarians, with eliciting feeling of a heavy armored army slowly marching forward. In the lyrics of 'Gloves Of Metal' it was the first time that Manowar mentions the name "Metal Kings", later on it become their sixth studio album called "Kings Of Metal" (which is the bands best known work, Manowar's highest-selling album worldwide and majority of Manowar's fans as their favorite album),that feature a title track with the same name and includes in other songs in the album and later on became their familiar nickname of the band.

The song is an exceptional musical triptych, with following Guitar trace of the main riff of the song. The song stay firm and anchored to the stylistic features of Epic Metal: slowness of the always granite riffs, imperious cuts, as well as a tapping in the truly Eighty and fantastic Guitar solo. Together with the rhythm duo to Columbus's Drums and DeMaio's Bass and Ross's Guitar achieves reminiscent of the clanking of armor and chains at marching speed. Eric's vocals are power with a tremendous range to an operatic maestro with incredible ease and employs beautiful falsetto and death-defying screams The high and low vocal ranges of 'Eric Adams' voice in the song are between G#5, C#5& A2.

The music video of “Gloves Of Metal” -was the band's first official music video that was filmed in the year 1983 and has a running time approximately 6 minutes. The music video opens with shots of seagulls and leather clad warriors riding on horseback through the forest,

the band performs on a concert stage for an enthusiastic audience, at the end they have a fighting and victory scenes.

The Web magazine "Vampster" named the video: "One of the most iconic that the metal scene has ever seen…'Gloves of Metal' is probably the best-known song on this album and this one too gets its power from its slow pace. That fits perfectly with the cover of 'Into Glory Ride'…".

In 2014, VH1 ranked the song 'Gloves Of Metal' as the 6th greatest Heavy Metal song with the word "Metal" in the title.

Track No. 4: Gates Of Valhalla

The song is a Heavy Metal/ Power Metal/ Viking Metal song, it's clearly Norse-influenced song about being a Viking warrior fighting and dying for glory in the afterlife, a fantasy-based heroic mythos that incorporates elements of Viking culture. The atmosphere of the song evoked classical heroic fantasy and mythology, and served as a predecessor to Viking metal. The song became Manowar's first ballads and a solid song with excellent vocals employs beautiful falsetto and death-defying screams, and beautiful melancholic lyrics. The song 'Gates Of Valhalla' made the band well known as "The Viking Metal Forefathers", idolizing the ancient Norsemen, with that song they wanted that Viking metal will be based entirely on gruesome legends and historically accurate descriptions of battles.

The song introduced by an excellent, evocative arpeggio on the 8-string Bass by DeMaio. After a first moment of solo bass, a carpet of Keyboards by Ross is timidly introduced which enhances Adams' singing, very particular and melodic start, after the first part of the song (bass& vocals) the Drums and Guitar burst into force, the riffing becomes linear and metallic. The Double bass Drums of Columbus supports the bass and guitar picks, complete with toms that sound like real Viking drums. The central part becomes in slower tempo, with the refrain with Ross's spectacular guitar solo, then an excellent and beautiful melancholic epic closure lyrically& vocally. The song wanted to create the atmosphere and to make the connection with the listeners inner eyes for colliding "Into Glory Ride" on a winged horse through the gates of Valhalla" the lyrics express the feeling with words like: "farewell to the Viking land...Death's chilling wind blows through my hair...I'm now immortal, I am there...Hear my sword sing as I ride across the sky...Valhalla the gods await me, Open wide thy gates embrace me, Great hall of the battle slain, With sword in hand...I scream the final battle cry..." , in the end of the song, when Eric Adams screaming after the guitar solo, "to let "you" know that you've finally made it home". The high and low vocal ranges of 'Eric Adams' voice in the song are between B4, D5, E5, F#5, A5& G5

Track No. 5: Hatred
The song is a Heavy Metal/ Doom metal song, an aggressive, dark and doom rhythm with strange and crazy guitars disharmonies, along with rhythm changes in atmospheric heavier drumming that makes an atmospherically dense. Eric Adams screaming with nasty and hateful vocals extraordinarily strong lungs (with maximum capacity) and thick vocal folds out with lyrics as "I taste your blood as it showers from my blade", and the song name is screamed twice in succession in the chorus, that more than lives up to its title name "Hatred".

The Song is about a warrio] (like 'Conan The Barbarian') who's as brutal, and mad as hell. He has the ingenuity required of a warrior, While he is extremely vengeful, and claims that there is no higher pleasure in life than “Crushing your enemy, seeing him driven before you, and hearing the lamentation of their women, his"...strength is hatred, torment and pain" "hatred burns inside…" of him against evil forces, he also desecrating their bodies, his highly skilled warrior with the sword "...The one that cannot die...", He's talented fighter who overpowers most men with his strength and skill, a talented leader with self titled "...The omen...", a born leader and a King "...I rule the world, the rats that race...".

The symbolism of The "Black Blood" that runs through "The Hatred Warrior" veins, came to express the importance of the color black in ancient history, which is associated with cruelty, brutality, death, evil, darkness, mourning and also with royal power, dignity and authority all of these "characteristics and designation" are connected to "The Hatred Warrior" through the lyrics of the song.

The song is the most particular piece from the album, its atmosphere that reigns from the beginning of the song: the guitar makes dissonant and lancinated flights, while Adams talks about the protagonist's heart, through which a black blood flows, making him full of hatred.

The highlight of the song is Eric Adam's powerful vocal performance with tremendous range, he employs extreme vocal range with changing octave all with loudness, high energy clean to heavier distortion, aggressive, sonic toughness and defying high- pitched emotionally insane screams. The high and low vocal ranges of 'Eric Adams' voice in the song are between B♭5, G5& B4

Track No. 6: Revelation (Death's Angel)
The song is a Heavy Metal/ Epic Metal/ Power Metal song, that draws on the New Testament's vision of the final Apocalypse, as told in the final book 'Revelation'. But Manowar turn the morality tale into one of "self- righteous fools" being cleansed by fire from the Earth, and the glory of the final battle against Satan. Interestingly, then, Manowar are siding with God and Jesus against The Devil, perhaps rejecting the Satanism of Metal for an explicit embrace of what Victorians called Muscular Christianity (Magan, 1996). The image of the Apocalypse in the song, has an almost majestic atmosphere and a characteristic galloping rhythm, with Scott's heavy drums especially striking and Ross's guitar work sustaining the atmosphere of impending doom, bolstering the uniqueness of the song The song introduced as an Epic Metal song by the Columbus Drums toms, before Ross Guitar and DeMaio Bass begin possessing certain very well-designed solutions (such as the part that is accelerating). The refrain is melodic and evokes powerful themes, that speak of the apocalypse with highlighting the "satanic" note, a very powerful, astral and vivid imagery, with a songwriting of excellent quality and full-bodied emotional vocals. The high and low vocal ranges of 'Eric Adams' voice in the song are between F#5, C5& B4

Track No. 7: Revenge (By the soldiers Of Death)
The song is a Heavy Metal/ Epic Metal/ Power Metal song, about the Revenge ("This song of greeting written for your tragic end") of soldiers of death ("Magic sons of demons and men"), describing their battles, wars and accomplishments filled with revenge after the fallen warriors/ soldiers, who have died in battle ("...Fallen brother as I hold closed your side …you killed my brother and all who take your side…For you shall not awake, let revenge be sweet… for when we march, your sword rides with me...").

The song also describes the battles and the results of them: "Steel meets steel, axes, broadsword and shield, their heads ride our spears and bodies cover the fields, Maim and kill them, take the women and children". The Soldiers of death has a partial similarity to Thulsa’s Riders of Doom (In 'Conan The Barbarian') in which the song starts with "Ride, Ride, Ride, Ride up from hell", As the riders in their dozens appear on the horizon, and to those who have crossed them, will soon be sack, slaughtered, and capturing the women and children  Resembling the attack on Conan's village, in the movie 'Conan The Barbarian'. The song also describes the source of the "Death soldiers": Who came from the underworld in lines such "Death is life!...by the full moon they rise from their graves…Through seas of blood, fighting with hell bent rage…Swear the creed of unity, by the circle of blood, We are one, We know not fear! Born to fight not run…".

Some reviewers committed that the song is "a perfect successor" of the Battle Hymn and follows is Musical structure, and to be put on a par with this song. The war drums are playing which bursts a verse that is very reminiscent of Battle Hymn, especially in the rhythm of the Bass, the interlude with 8-string Bass, solemn and epic, and follows the characteristic structure of the epic suites of Manowar. The song closes after a curated Guitar solo, with a great escalation of emotions, accompanied by the crescendo of the whole band, and then into a classic and thrilling ending, The performance is undeniably powerful. The high and low vocal ranges of 'Eric Adams' voice in the song are between F5, C5, D5, B4& G2.

Nickelodeon's Livewire performance
In the year 1983, soon after the release of the new album ‘Into Glory Ride’, Manowar appeared at the award-winning show and No. 1 rated program of 'Nickeloden' channel: A talk show called ‘Livewire’(The series was designed for kids of all ages, and the show's main focus discussed, true current events and stories during those times).The Show format was a "live on tape" feature a host and a participating audience of about 20-30 teenagers with adults. The show was most famously known for giving relatively unknown bands and singers their first television appearance. As part of Manowar album's promotion, their performance included: Two live songs and gave an interview to the host and audience. Manowar dressed to the show as Barbarian Warriors like in the cover of the album 'Into The Glory' cover and like in the music video 'Gloves Of Metal'. The performance started with the band playing live the song “Gloves Of Metal” and right after it, at the end of the performance, they sat down and answered questions from a well-mannered host 'Fred Newman' and from a youngsters and their parents and grandparents. Right after the interview, the band performed the song “Revolution (Death angel)” with the ending credits of the show following with the song till the end.

Into Glory Ride Imperial Edition (Remixed/Remastered) 
On 29 March 2019, Into Glory Ride album was re-released after being revitalized for a new and improved sound experience. Manowar had the original multitrack master recordings transferred from analog to digital in 96 kHz quality, adding the depth, power, and clarity to the album's tracks. The album was remixed in Manowar's 'Valhalla Studios' in New York, the band stated that they had been 'forced into a somewhat rushed and compromised production' during the original recording. The front cover of the 'Imperial edition' album differs from the original album front cover. The front cover of the 'Imperial Edition' album includes an artwork by the artist 'Ken Kelly', whose inspiration for the artwork was from one of the album's track: 'Secret Of Steel' following by the song lyrics such as "...One without name or number soon would show...Riding a chariot made of gold...A sceptre of iron could mercy bring... the creator and king". 
On the cover there is a painting of the band's mascot, 'The Faceless Warrior'/ 'The King Of Metal', riding a golden chariot driving by a black and brown horse, on the chariot there is also a golden crown and a black flag with a golden ring on it (also symbolizing another song of the band, "The Crown And The Ring", from their sixth album "Kings of Metal"); 'The Faceless Warrior' holding with his left hand an iron sceptre and on his right hand a horse straps for the horses, on the ground there is a dead man, who is being stabbed with a well known sword of the band (also shown at the original cover of the album 'Into Glory Ride') and near the corpse and near 'The Faceless Warrior' chariot, there are a lot of ccattered skulls with spilled blood, on one of them there is another of the band's sword.

Reception
In the year 2019, the online magazine 'Metal Invader' gave a review with quotes like:"....Into Glory Ride": We are literally dealing with one of the masterpieces of a band that influenced the Metal firm as little as possible... So they deserve our respect...", also reviewing the 'Imperial edition': "...Anyway, the 2019 version deserves to be next to the classic since it brings to the surface many new elements in terms of sound. We also have the new cover and generally a neat reissue of a classic album...."

In the years 2017, the online magazine 'The Metal Crypt' gave a review and rated to the album with 4.25 from 5 points and rated with 4.9 stars from 5 stars, with quotes like:"...Into Glory Ride is a mandatory release, not only for Manowar fans, but for all fans of epic Heavy Metal..."

In the year 2006, the online magazine 'Metalfan.nl' gave a review and rated to the album with 94 from 100 points, with quotes like: "Into Glory Ride is an almost entirely epic album, further developing the aspects of the debut's best songs... A top record from a top band."

In 2005, Into Glory Ride was ranked number 444 in Rock Hard magazine's book of The 500 Greatest Rock & Metal Albums of All Time.

In 2004, the online magazine 'The Bloodchamber', gave a review and rated the album 10 out of 10, with quotes like:"...It is the best that MANOWAR has ever released! The style moves away from hard rock compared to the debut and heralds the most glorious era of the Kings of Metal. (Into Glory Ride, Hail to England, Sign of the Hammer)... a true metal masterpiece was delivered that is looking for its equal. And because of the songwriting as well as the technically brilliant songs, the top grade is absolutely appropriate!..."

In the year 2000, the online magazine 'Power Metal.de' gave a review and rated the album with 9.32 stars from 10 stars, with quotes like: "...The band got that very well!!!...MANOWAR have remained absolutely true to each other with the disc!!!..."

In the year 2000, the online magazine 'Vampster' gave a review to the album, with quotes like: "Ultimately, Into Glory Ride is still an absolute killer for me and at the same time this album makes me sad, because I know that MANOWAR will never write such an album again - not even remotely. The argument for the uniqueness of Into Glory Ride is that to date no band has managed to create a comparable work..."

Track listing
All songs written by Joey DeMaio, except where noted.

Cover versions
 UK metal band Solstice covered "Gloves of Metal" on a 2001 split with Slough Feg.

Personnel

Manowar
Eric Adams – vocals
Ross the Boss – guitars, keyboards
Joey DeMaio – bass, bass pedals
Scott Columbus – drums, percussion

Production 
Jon Mathias – producer, engineer
John Petre – assistant engineer
Joe Brescio – mastering
Dennis "Snake" Dragone, Armond "The Arm" Biondi, Michael "Moto" Malvasio, Anthony Chiofalo – technicians
Barbata Cesiro – coordinator
Geoffrey Hargrave Thomas – art direction, illustrations (photo)
Melissa Chatain – art supervision
Jay Bergen – management, representation

References 

1983 albums
Manowar albums
Music for Nations albums
Megaforce Records albums